Deborah "Debbie" Rodriguez is an American writer, hairdresser, and humanitarian. She is noted for creating safe spaces that provide women with a way out of domestic violence and chaotic circumstances.

Biography
In 2001, Deborah Rodriguez went to Afghanistan as part of a group offering aid after the fall of the Taliban. There, she helped found a beauty school that trained 200 women in the art of hairdressing, many of whom went on to run their own salons, giving them the opportunity to start their own business and provide for their families. She later opened a coffee shop in Kabul.

Rodriguez wrote two bestselling books based on her experiences in Afghanistan, The Kabul Beauty School and The Little Coffee Shop of Kabul, as well as Return to the Little Coffee Shop of Kabul. At one point, Kabul Beauty School was slated to become a movie, with Sandra Bullock playing the lead.

As of 2014, Rodriguez lives in Mazatlán, Mexico, where she is the owner of Tippy Toes Salon and Marrakesh Spa, and where she established Project Mariposa, providing funding for young women to attend beauty school, with the goal of helping them become independent and self-supporting. Margarita Wednesdays (The House on Carnaval Street), a book detailing her journey to remake her life after being forced to leave Afghanistan, was released in June 2014. Her other books include the novels The Zanzibar Wife, and The Moroccan Daughter

As of 2021, Rodriguez has been working to help 130 Afghans, including former staff and beauty school students, leave Afghanistan. As the president of the non-profit Oasis Rescue, she is raising money to support efforts for Afghans who are seeking to leave the country, as well as those who have left and find themselves in need.

Some controversy followed the publishing of Kabul Beauty School. Other women who were also involved at the founding of the Kabul Beauty School say the book is filled with inaccuracies and inconsistencies, that events did not unfold the way Rodriguez depicts them. Though it was acknowledged that some personal, place and organization names were changed in the book, and some chronological details adjusted. Some of the women who worked at the beauty school said that, because of the publication of the book and the details it revealed about them, their lives had been put in danger. Some also claimed that Rodriguez had not made good on promises for financial support and other help. However, Rodriguez claims that she was careful to protect the identities of the women mentioned in the book, and that they were all enthusiastic about telling their stories knowing that was the case.

In 2002, Rodriguez married an Afghan, Samer (Sam) Mohammad Abdul Khan, who worked for Afghan warlord Abdul Rashid Dostum. At the time he had a wife in Saudi Arabia, who became pregnant with his eighth child while he was married to Rodriguez. The marriage with Rodriguez was reported as a happy one as late as April 2007, but soon after, she had to flee Afghanistan.

Publications

Non-fiction
 Kabul Beauty School: An American Woman Goes Behind the Veil (1 January 2007,)
 Margarita Wednesdays: Making a New Life by the Mexican Sea (10 June 2014,) (published as The House on Carnaval Street in some countries)

Fiction
 The Little Coffee Shop of Kabul (19 November 2012,)
 Return to the Little Coffee Shop of Kabul (28 March 2016,)
The Zanzibar Wife (2018,)
 Island on the Edge of the World (5 November 2019,)
 The Moroccan Daughter (2 February 2021,)

See also

 Abdul Rashid Dostum
 Greg Mortenson
 Sarah Chayes
 Ministry of Women's Affairs (Afghanistan)
 Women in Afghanistan

References

External links

American expatriates in Afghanistan
Year of birth missing (living people)
Living people
American humanitarians
Women humanitarians
21st-century American memoirists
American women memoirists
Place of birth missing (living people)
21st-century American women writers
American expatriates in Mexico
American women novelists
American philanthropists
American fiction writers